Terešov is a municipality and village in Rokycany District in the Plzeň Region of the Czech Republic. It has about 200 inhabitants.

Administrative parts
The village of Bílá Skála is an administrative part of Terešov.

Geography
It lies in the Křivoklát Highlands. The Terešovský Creek flows through the municipality. The eastern part of the municipal territory extends into the Křivoklátsko Protected Landscape Area.

History

The first written mention of Terešov is from 1361.

The Jewish cemetery in Terešov was founded in 1623. After that, the Jewish community was established as the first in the Rokycany District. By separating from this community, other communities were formed in the district. The first synagogue in Terešov was built around 1680. The last synagogue, which was built at the turn of the 18th and 19th centuries, was demolished in 1964.

Sights

In 1723 Václav Diviš Miseroni of Lisson, the then owner of Terešov, had a small baroque castle built. It is a simple one-storey building with mansard roof. Today, it houses a detention institute for youth.

The stone road bridge in the centre of Terešov is a cultural monument.

The Jewish cemetery is preserved until today. It is located anear the village of Bílá Skála. The oldest preserved tombstones dates from 1725–1729. The wall of the cemetery is partly in ruins.

References

External links

Villages in Rokycany District